The Singapore Armed Forces (SAF) are the military services of the Republic of Singapore, responsible for protecting and defending the security interests and the sovereignty of the country. A military component of the Ministry of Defence (MINDEF), the armed forces have four service branches: the Army, the Navy, the Air Force, and the Digital and Intelligence Service. An integrated force, it is one of the most capable, robust, technologically sophisticated and powerful militaries in Southeast Asia and the surrounding regions. The SAF is headed by the chief of Defence Force, who holds the rank of a Lieutenant-General or Vice-Admiral, and is appointed by the president of Singapore. 

The SAF consists of four service branches: the Singapore Army, the Republic of Singapore Navy (RSN), the Republic of Singapore Air Force (RSAF), and the Digital and Intelligence Service (DIS). The SAF protects the interests, sovereignty and territorial integrity of Singapore from external threats. In recent years, the SAF has also taken on a more active role in counter-terrorism efforts both domestically and abroad. 

Since its inception, the SAF has been involved in various operations, both within and outside of Singapore's borders. These include peacekeeping missions in places such as Afghanistan, Iraq, Nepal and Timor Leste, as well as the humanitarian aid operations in various countries, such as the Hurricane Katrina in 2005. In addition, the SAF has assisted the United Nations (UN) to oversee and supervise the electoral process in countries such as Cambodia, Ethiopia, Namibia and South Africa.

It has an approximate active strength of over 71,000 full-time personnel and is capable of mobilising over 352,500 reservists (also known as National Servicemen, or NSmen) in the event of national exigencies or a full-scale war. It also has a large pool of conscripts (also known as Full-time National Servicemen, or NSFs) in the active and reserve forces, with about 50,000 reaching military age annually.

History

Pre-independence
Singapore's military role stems from its strategic geographical location, an asset exploited by both local settlers and foreign colonists alike. Archaeological excavations have discovered remnants of fortresses and other forms of military fortifications in pre-colonial Singapore. Stamford Raffles, founder of modern Singapore, chose Singapore in 1819 to establish a new British colony with the security concerns of the British in the Far East in mind against the Dutch. Thus, Singapore, which attained the Crown colony status, played an active role in British military interests for decades, particularly in the years leading up to the First and Second World Wars.

The Singapore Volunteer Rifle Corps (SVRC) was first created in 1854 as a private organisation, with the governor serving as its first Colonel. It was later gazetted in 1857. However, participation in the SVRC was weak and it was disbanded on 16 December 1887 in favour of forming an artillery corps instead. This was to be the Singapore Volunteer Artillery (SVA), which was formed in 1888 to operate the gun emplacements around Singapore, and is also considered to be the predecessor of the artillery formation of the Singapore Armed Forces. In 1901, additional non-artillery units were set up in, including a Chinese infantry company, Eurasian infantry company, and the Singapore Volunteer Engineers, leading to the force being renamed as the Singapore Volunteer Corps (SVC). It assisted in suppressing the 1915 Singapore Mutiny. In 1921, the SVC was combined with other volunteer forces from Malacca and Penang as the Straits Settlements Volunteer Force (SSVF).

During World War II, the SSVF took part in the Battle of Singapore but most of its members were captured on 15 February 1942 when their positions were overrun by Japanese forces. After the end of the war, the SSVF was re-constituted in 1948, but the SVF was absorbed into the Singapore Military Forces (SMF, predecessor of the SAF) following the disbandment of the SSVF in 1954. Subsequently, in 1961, SMF was renamed to the Singapore Armed Forces (SAF).

Post-independence
When Singapore achieved independence in 1965, its military consisted of only two infantry regiments, commanded by British officers and made up of mostly non-Singaporean residents. Britain pulled its military out of Singapore in October 1971, leaving behind only a small amount of British, Australian and New Zealand forces as a token military presence. The last of the British soldiers left Singapore in March 1976. The New Zealand troops were the last to leave Singapore, in 1989.

Singapore believed that it needed a larger, capable yet economic-efficient defence force to protect and defend itself as it is surrounded by several larger neighbouring countries in the Southeast Asia region that are often hostile to them. At that time, Singapore enlisted the covert assistance of Israel, which sent its military advisers who helped Singapore set up a defence force modelled in part after the Israel Defense Forces (IDF). Jungle warfare techniques were taught so that the Singapore Army could engage in combat conflict in the jungle areas of its neighbouring countries, if need be. The army also procured battle tanks from Israel, doing so before neighbouring Malaysia acquired theirs, thereby gaining an advantage.

On 1 July 2018, Minister for Defence Ng Eng Hen announced that the SAF would transition from its current third-generation technologies to fourth [next-gen] technologies by overhauling its current arsenal.

On 27 February 2019, the office of Inspector-General of the Armed Forces was set up to ensure that safety protocols are applied and enforced throughout the military following the death of Aloysius Pang who was the fourth training related fatality in 18 months following 2017.

Singapore has been described as "a military powerhouse with the best air force and navy in Southeast Asia." Singapore's vast wealth allows it to acquire and make the best equipment available as well as incorporate high-end technological equipment into its nation military forces. The SAF is also called "the most technologically advanced armed forces across the Association of Southeast Asian Nation states"—referring to ASEAN.

A key recent example was Singapore's decision to acquire four Lockheed Martin's F-35B Joint Strike Fighters, which the United States Congress approved, with the option to acquire a further eight more and beyond. This acquisition is significant as "Singapore will fly the most advanced fleet of fighters in its region" which reflects its security relationship with the United States. In addition, the F-35Bs have a significant impact to Singapore's air power since the land limited country no longer needs to depend on "long, vulnerable runways" to operate the aircraft due to the fifth-generation's fighter jet's short-takeoff-and-vertical landing capability. The jet's advanced network-enabled capabilities would be additionally advantageous for Singapore which is seeking to modernise its military. Furthermore, Singapore stands out from all the other countries in Southeast Asia with its technological sophistication and equipments that "operates at a very high level of capability" and are "all integrated into a single cohesive fighting force."

Armed Forces Day is commemorated by the SAF annually on 1 July, with a parade held at the SAFTI Military Institute.

Recent years

Contribution in times of national crises
On 15 March 1986, the six-storey Hotel New World, a 15-year-old, one-star budget hotel situated at the junction of Serangoon Road and Owen Road collapsed. SAF soldiers aided in rescue operations, and had worked alongside members of the Singapore Civil Defence Force (SCDF) to remove the rubble. RSAF UH-1H helicopters were on standby at the nearby Farrer Park football field to evacuate rescued victims to the Singapore General Hospital.

On 26 March 1991, Singapore Airlines Flight 117 was hijacked by four Pakistanis en route to Singapore. Upon landing in Changi Airport at 8:15pm SGT, the hijackers demanded the release of several Pakistan Peoples Party members. Negotiations faltered, and after the hijackers gave their ultimatum to have their demands fulfilled at 6.15am SGT of the following morning, Commandos from SAF's Special Operations Force (SOF) stormed the plane and shot all of the hijackers dead and rescued the hostages.

During the SARS outbreak in 2003, SAF paramedics were deployed at Changi International Airport to screen incoming passengers from places hit by SARS such as Hong Kong, China, Hanoi and Toronto. The SAF also deployed 220 servicemen with operations such as screening for SARS, contact tracing and enforcing home quarantine orders. The team also managed other major operations such as the quarantine of 1,500 staff from the Institute of Mental Health.

In 2004, the Singapore Armed Forces also responded to the 2004 Indian Ocean earthquake and tsunami. In addition to the human tolls, being one of the nearest neighbors to the tsunami-hit countries and a nation that was not directly affected by the recent disaster, Singapore has been able to render prompt help as part of the global relief efforts.

During the COVID-19 pandemic since 2020, over 1,500 SAF servicemen were called upon to pack 5.2 million masks and transport them to distribution centers across Singapore in time for the start of distribution on 1 February that year. A MINDEF personnel also ran the National Call Centre to address public queries on the collection of reusable masks, which were distributed in April. Personnel manning the phone lines included volunteers from MINDEF and the SAF, as well as clan associations, grounded staff from Singapore Airlines, and other retrenched workers, who were employed by MINDEF on short-term contracts. The SAF also deployed manpower to assist in manning thermal imagery machines at the airport to pick out travellers with symptoms.

To aid in operations, MINDEF had also recruited former SAF regulars as the inter-agency task force handling the spike in cases from foreign worker dormitories, including “personnel with operational experience.” They were to augment the Forward Assurance Support Teams (FAST) deployed at various foreign worker dormitories. Both regular and full-time national servicemen were deployed to provide healthcare services for patients at one of the CIFs set up in the Singapore EXPO halls.

The SAF also housed about 3,000 recovering migrant workers with COVID-19 in six military camps across Singapore. The Jurong, Bedok, Amoy Quee, Guillemard, Tanjong Gul and Lim Chu Kang camps had been converted into community recovery facilities (CRFs). Operational since 28 April 2020, the CRFs are for COVID-19 patients who remain well at Day 14 of the disease and do not require further medical care.

Separately, more than 1,300 SAF personnel were also deployed to make calls to do contact tracing and check compliance with stay at home notices. These contact tracers worked with Ministry of Health officials to fill gaps in the activity maps of confirmed or suspected cases. Defence Science and Technology Agency Engineers also developed tools to automate the extraction and fusion of data for analysis. The contact tracers were reported to make between 1,000 and 2,000 calls a day.

Defence policy

Deterrence and diplomacy have been the fundamental tenets of Singapore's military defence policy. Through the years, the military has developed extensive links with armed forces from other countries. In recent years, there has also been an increased emphasis on international peace-keeping and relief operations, notably the peace-keeping operations in Afghanistan, East Timor, the Persian Gulf and disaster relief in the Indian Ocean earthquake-tsunami of 2004, the 2005 Nias earthquake and 2006 Yogyakarta earthquake both in Indonesia, Hurricane Katrina in the United States and the 2008 Sichuan earthquake in China.

According to military and strategic analysts, such as Tim Huxley in Defending the Lion City, Singapore is well poised to be using a forward-defence military doctrine. In historical news archives, there were also defence analogies used by Singapore founders that Singapore must be a poison shrimp and later, porcupine. Thenceforth, if a wartime military battle is to take place on the island of Singapore, the effects would be devastating to both the people and infrastructure. Press statements from Singapore's Ministry of Defence (MINDEF) describe the SAF as a deterrent force. The SAF's declared mission statement is to "enhance Singapore’s peace and security through deterrence and diplomacy, and should these fail, to secure a swift and decisive victory over the aggressor".

Today, a career military force of 39,000 is supplemented by 46,800 men on active National Service duty, the latter generally filling up the lower ranks. This group of just over 80,000 officers and servicemen/women staffs the command structure, advises the government, manages the bases, teaches at the tri-service SAFTI Military Institute, flies the on-call jets, crews the ships on-patrol and stands watch over the straits. They comprise both the top command structure and what might be called the "Standing Forces" which can go into a humanitarian relief or combat situation instantly. The main force actually comprises 400,000 or so Operationally-Ready National Servicemen (ORNSmen). This is the full mobilization force that can be called up within a few days. They are the 10-year ORNSmen with regular training and call-up cycles. Full sets of light equipment stands ready for them in armories and heavy equipment for their units is maintained in dedicated bunkers. Singapore is very high tech and individuals can be reached almost instantly; thus the system is highly flexible, so only the units and numbers needed for a particular task can be summoned. If called up they would be integrated into, augment and dramatically expand the "Standing Forces" up to five times its peacetime size, fully staffed and equipped, while maintaining a cohesive structure.

The SAF's policy towards Malays, who share religious and ethnic ties with Singapore's largest neighbours, Malaysia and Indonesia, has been a source of controversy over the years. Malays were virtually excluded from conscription from the beginning of the draft in 1967 until 1977 and, after the policy was eased, were assigned mainly to serve in the police and civil defence (fire brigade), not active combat roles. In 1987, BG(NS) Lee Hsien Loong (then Second Minister for Defence) stated that "If there is a conflict, if the SAF is called to defend the homeland, we do not want to put any of our soldiers in a difficult position where his emotions for the nation may be in conflict with his religion" and in The Roar of the Lion City (2007), military analyst Sean Walsh claimed that "official discrimination against the Malay population remains an open secret". The Ministry of Defence contests the charge, noting that there are "Malay pilots, commandos and air defence personnel" and stating that "the proportion of eligible Malays selected for specialist and officer training is similar to the proportion for eligible non-Malays."

Women are exempt from full-time National Service, but can sign on as a career regular soldier in both combat and non-combat roles, some as combat officers, but mostly in clerical and logistic positions in the earlier years. The range of positions available to women has been expanded gradually, with some exceptions in vocations. In July 2007, the SAF held an exhibition highlighting the contributions of women in the armed forces. Annual women career seminars are conducted to inform Singaporean women of careers in the SAF facing competitive factors in the labour force. In recent years, some women have taken higher positions, such as BG Gan Siow Huang, who is the highest ranking female officer and the first female General in the SAF.

In 2014, a governmental Committee to Strengthening NS (CSNS) decided to establish a SAF Volunteer Corps (SAFVC). This will enable women, first generation Permanent Residents and new citizens to contribute to national defence and strengthen support for NS. The volunteers will undergo a four-week course to gain basic military skills and values. They will be orientated to their operational and professional roles in the SAFVC.

National Service

Under the Enlistment Act 1970, conscription is mandatory for all "persons subject to [the] act", defined as those who are not less than 16 years and 6 months of age and not more than 40 years of age, with some exemptions and with no specific bias to gender (not limited to males). In practice however, it is only compulsory for all fit and able-bodied Singaporean men who have reached 18 years of age, and are not deferred for certain reasons, to be conscripted in military service, or Full-time National Service (NSF).

NS was initially three years for commissioned officers and two years for other ranks, but it was later revised to two years and six months for soldiers with the rank of Corporal and above, and two years for those with the rank of Lance Corporal or lower. In June 2004, a major announcement review was conducted to NS was shortened to two years for all Full-time National Servicemen (NSFs), regardless of rank, due to changes in population demographics, manpower requirements and technological advancements. Combat fit NSFs (PES A/B1) who obtain a silver or gold standard in the NAPFA test will have another two months reduction, serving 22 months of NS effectively. Upon completion of their NSF stint, servicemen will be considered as having reached their Operationally-ready Date (ORD) and will be known as Operationally-ready National Servicemen (NSmen). Almost all NSmen will have to go through a 10-year reservist cycle of military training with their assigned unit deployment. Almost all NSmen are obliged to be called up annually for a maximum of 40 days per workyear for national duties, refresher trainings, mobilisations, upgrading courses and physical fitness tests and conditioning, depending on their NS unit deployment.

Training

Prior to enlistment, pre-enlistees (recruits) are required to attend a medical examination (PULHHEEMS) to determine their medical status to assess vocational suitability postings. They will then be issued a "Physical Employment Status" (PES), which will be used as a guideline to determine for which vocation groupings they are deemed suitable.

PES A and PES B1 (combat-fit) recruits go through a nine-week Basic Military Training (BMT) program, held at the Basic Military Training Centre (BMTC) on the offshore island of Pulau Tekong. Recruits who are considered obese, are required to attend a 19-week PES Bp BMT weight-loss program. PES B2 formally PES C1 (fit for some combat vocations) recruits will go through a nine-week modified BMT programme at BMTC. PES C and PES E recruits (non-combat-fit) undertake a nine-week modified BMT program in BMTC School V at Kranji Camp II, where serviceman undergoing a four-week modified BMT programme before being deployed to various combat service support vocations such as Admin Support Assistant (ASA), Transport Operator, and Supply Assistant (SA). The One-BMT programme was fully implemented in November 2017 thus all servicemen including mono-intakes with the exception of those in commandos, naval divers and service support vocation units will complete their BMT at BMTC. Mono-intake recruits will return to their unit after BMT.

In standard BMT package, all recruits attend component trainings on fieldcraft, basic survival skills, weapon maintenance and a field camp, participate in live firing and hand grenade throwing exercises, go through a Standard Obstacle Course (SOC), and do daily physical training in preparation for the Individual Physical Proficiency Test (IPPT). The selected ones among NS recruits in BMT are assessed via SITEST for suitability of commander trainings to become officers or specialists. They are posted to the Officer Cadet School (OCS) or the Specialist Cadet School (SCS) respectively for commander training. The majority of the rest of recruits, known as enlistees, are posted to various NS units or vocational training institutes where the newly minted privates undergo continuous, specialised and further vocational trainings to pass out successfully as a vocationalist.

Due to land space limitations on Singapore's territorial land and waters, some specialised training programmes and facilities are located overseas e.g. 130 Squadron in Australia, 150 Squadron in France.

Military education
Initially, commissioned officers were drawn exclusively from the ranks of Singaporeans who had completed their GCE A levels or embarked on tertiary studies. While the requirements have since been revised, the SAF has still been criticised for "using a promotion system that is based more on education and scholarships than on proven competence".

Officers receive their initial leadership training at the tri-service OCS in the SAFTI Military Institute (SAFTI MI). As they progress in their career, they may undergo further formal military education at the SAF Advanced Schools and the Goh Keng Swee Command and Staff College. On the other hand, specialists first receive leadership training at the SCS. Future platoon sergeants and Company Sergeant Majors receive further instruction at the Advanced Specialist Training Wing (ASTW) in SCS. Specialists undergo further education at the SAFWOS Leadership School before receiving their appointments as Warrant Officers.

OCS and SCS both have an infantry-based curriculum; special-to-arms training for both officers and WOSPECs is conducted at various training institutes and establishments such as the SAF Medical Training Institute (SMTI), Artillery Institute (AI), Signals Institute (SI), Engineer Training Institute (ETI), Armour Training Institute (ATI), Motorised Infantry Training Institute (MITI), Supply & Transport Centre (STC) and Ordnance Engineering Training Institute (OETI).

Pointer is the official journal of the SAF. It is a quarterly publication distributed to all Officers and Warrant Officers, which helps with their ongoing professional education.

Foreign defence relations
Singapore is part of the Five Power Defence Arrangements, whose other members include the United Kingdom, Australia, New Zealand and Malaysia. Designed to replace the former defence role of the British in Singapore and Malaysia, the arrangement obliges members to consult in the event of external threat against Malaysia and Singapore. To this end, an Integrated Air Defence System is set up in Butterworth, Malaysia involving the stationing of officers from the 5 countries at its headquarters.

In 1975, President Chiang Ching-kuo and Prime Minister Lee Kuan Yew signed an agreement code-named “Project Starlight” (星光計畫, also known as Hsing Kuang), wherein Singaporean troops could conduct training exercises in Taiwan. These exercises, engaging as many as 10,000 troops at any one time, provided officers a chance to simulate wartime conditions more closely and gain experience in the command and control of operations involving several battalions.

Singapore has consistently supported a strong US military presence in the Asia-Pacific region. In 1990, the US and Singapore signed a memorandum of understanding (MOU) which allows the US access to Singapore facilities at Paya Lebar Air Base and the Sembawang wharves. Under the MOU, a US Navy logistics unit was established in Singapore in 1992; US fighter aircraft deploy periodically to Singapore for exercises, and a number of US military vessels visit Singapore. The US Navy's Task Force 73/Commander, Logistics Group Western Pacific is now located at Sembawang. The MOU was amended in 1999 to permit US naval vessels to berth at Changi Naval Base, which was completed in early 2001.

Singapore's defence resources have also been used for international humanitarian aid missions. They included United Nations peacekeeping missions in areas such as Kosovo, Kuwait and East Timor, participation in the Multi-National Force – Iraq, sending military equipment and personnel to assist in the humanitarian rescue and relief efforts in Indonesia after the 2004 Indian Ocean earthquake and tsunami, and the United States after Hurricane Katrina, sending medical supplies and personnel in response to the earthquake in Nepal and establishing medical and dental assets for use by the Afghan people. The Republic of Singapore Navy contributes to anti-piracy efforts in the Gulf of Aden off the eastern coast of Somalia as part of the 25 nations coalition Combined Maritime Forces. Several of the SAF's top officers have thus overseas operational military experience. Singapore was the only Asian country to contribute assets and personnel to the Global Coalition to Defeat ISIS and had participated in Operation Gallant Phoenix since May 2017.

Many of the Singapore's air units are located abroad such as: No. 130 Squadron in Australia, No. 150 Squadron in France, or joint USAF-RSAF 425th and 428th Fighter Squadron. Since 2009, up to 90 soldiers annually are sent to Germany for exercises of a maximum of seven weeks each time at the Bergen-Hohne Training Area and other locations.

Legislation
Under the Singapore Armed Forces Act, the president of Singapore has the authority to raise and maintain the SAF. The president also has the power to form, disband or amalgamate units within the SAF.

The Armed Forces Council (AFC) administers matters relating to the SAF under the Singapore Armed Forces Act. The AFC consists of:
 Minister for Defence and other ministers who are responsible for defence matters or has been assigned to assist them;
 the Permanent Secretaries of the Ministry of Defence;
 the Chief of Defence Force (CDF);
 the Chief of Army (COA);
 the Chief of Air Force (CAF);
 the Chief of Navy (CNV);
 the Chief of Digital and Intelligence Service (CDI) and
 not more than four other members as the president may appoint if the president, acting in their discretion, concurs with the advice of the prime minister.

Military offences
Military offences are governed by the SAF and the Enlistment Act in the Singapore Statutes. However, civilian offences (e.g. against the Penal Code) may also amount to a military offence. Offences may be prosecuted by military prosecutors, through the military justice system, or through the civilian judicial system.

Organisation

Services 
The SAF consists of four service branches:
 Army (three Combined Arms Divisions: 3 Div, 6 Div & 9 Div, two Army Operational Reserve Divisions, 21st and 25th, and one island defence command: 2nd People's Defence Forces)
 Air Force (17 squadrons and four air bases)
 Navy (five commands, eight flotillas, and two naval bases)
 Digital and Intelligence Service (inaugurated in 2022)

Task Forces
The SAF comprises seven standing task forces:

 Army Deployment Force
 Island Defence Task Force
 Joint Task Force
 Special Operations Task Force; an integrated joint command formed in 2009, to combat common terrorist threats. It comprises selected members of the 1st Commando Battalion's Special Operations Force, Naval Diving Unit's Special Warfare Group and other forces. The practice and theory of Special Operations Forces has been discussed in the inaugural monograph published by Pointer, titled Key Perspectives on Special Forces. The monograph was edited and developed by former Commando Officer Kwong Weng Yap.
 Maritime Security Task Force; to ensure Singapore's maritime security and act as a co-ordinating agency for all national maritime agencies to allow for the seamless execution of maritime security operations.
 Air Defence Task Force
 Cybersecurity Task Force

Defence Agencies 
Supporting the combat role of the SAF, are other governmental organisations of the Ministry of Defence (MINDEF), such as the Defence Policy Group, the Defence Management Group, the Defence Technology Group, and the Defence Science & Technology Agency. Within these groups are the Central Manpower Base (CMPB), Defence Cyber Organisation, and the Military Security Department (MSD). Domestic technology companies also play a role in building up Singapore's military capabilities, particularly the government-linked ST Engineering (formerly known as Chartered Industries of Singapore), which designed and built some of the SAF's more advanced weaponry and equipment based on specific local requirements which may be expensive for foreign companies to adapt and produce.

Chief of Defence Force (CDF)

The position of Chief of Defence Force was established in 1990. Winston Choo, as head of the defence forces was previously known as Chief of the General Staff. The SAF is headed by the Chief of Defence Force (CDF), a three-star General (i.e. Lieutenant General/Vice Admiral) by establishment and the sole and only (active) SAF General that can be promoted or hold three-star rank; he is assisted by the four chiefs of the respective services (Army, Air Force, Navy, Digital and Intelligence Service), who are two-star generals/admirals by establishment (or Major-General/Rear-Admiral). The SAF has a Sergeant Major who currently holds the rank of CWO. The CDF is supported by the Chief of Staff, Joint Staff, the Joint Operations Directorate, Joint Plans & Transformation Department, the Joint Manpower Department, the Joint Logistic Department, the Joint Intelligence Directorate, and Office of the Inspector-General of the Armed Forces.

Ranks 

There are three different rank structures in the SAF. Below is the ranks in the SAF in ascending order for the different schemes of service.

Technology in the SAF

The SAF utilises technology as "force multipliers", especially in the area of C4I integration, which will enable its various units to fight in an integrated manner. The Army, Air Force and Navy are linked via advanced data-links and networks to enable coordinated attacks and support for various units and forces. Technology is an important element in the SAF's transformation into a 3rd Generation Fighting Force.

The SAF acknowledges that technology is crucial for overcoming the limitations of Singapore's small population. Having consistently had one of the largest defence budgets in the Asia-Pacific region, Singapore has focused on maintaining its spending on sophisticated and superior weaponry. Research and experimentation to develop a technological edge began as early as 1971, even though the SAF then had only rudimentary capabilities. The effort started off with a three-man team. At present, the Ministry of Defence (MINDEF) is one of the largest employers of engineers and scientists in Singapore and the SAF continues to devote considerable resources to defence research and development (R&D) and experimentation—5% and 1% of the defence budget, respectively. Singapore's education system has also produced national servicemen who can be trained to operate SAF's sophisticated platforms and systems.

In Sep 2008, the SAF officially opened its Murai Urban Training Facility (MUTF) to hone the SAF's networked urban operations capability. The MUTF resembles a typical town and allows the soldiers to train realistically in an urban setting. In the same month, the SAF's new combat uniform, as well as the Advanced Combat Man System, were also unveiled for the first time.

The country also has an established military manufacturing industry that is responsible for the design and development of the following military hardware:
 PRIMUS – Self-propelled Howitzer
 Bionix II – Infantry Fighting Vehicle (an upgrade of the Bionix AFV)
 MATADOR – Unguided Short Range Anti-Armour Weapon
 Terrex I, II, III – Infantry Carrier Vehicle 
PEGASUS – Light Weight Howitzer
 SAR 21 & Bullpup multirole combat rifle – Bullpup Assault Rifle
 Formidable-Class Stealth Frigate – warships designed with stealthy characteristics, equipped with advanced combat systems and with longer endurance
 Independence-class littoral mission vessel – warships designed for littoral and coastal warfare

Uniforms

The SAF's first-generation uniform is named Temasek Green from the army's simple flat green uniform, with brown and blue for the navy and air force respectively.

This was followed by the second-generation uniform which used a patchy camouflage pattern for the army while both the navy and air force used overalls.
 
The current (third generation) combat uniform, more commonly known as the No. 4, used by the tri-services are based on digital camouflage with base colors green, blue and light grey for the army, air force and navy respectively. In June 2018, the SAF introduced a new variant of the uniform for combat units which provides more effective cooling similar to the ones issued to US army personnel for tropical climate.

The SAF's desert-camouflage uniforms are only issued to personnel deployed overseas to countries such as Iraq and Afghanistan.

See also

 Singapore Armed Forces ranks
 National service in Singapore
 SAFTI Military Institute
 SAF Medical Training Institute
 Singapore Armed Forces Band
 RSAF Black Knights
 SAF Volunteer Corps (SAFVC)
 National Cadet Corps (NCC)
 Awards and decorations of the Singapore Armed Forces
 Awards for Singapore National Serviceman
 Singapore Armed Forces Best Unit Competition
 Singapore Armed Forces Merit Scholarship (Women)
 List of Singapore Armed Forces bases

Notes

References

External links

 Official websites: MINDEF, Singapore Army, Singapore Navy, Singapore Air Force
 The 3rd Generation SAF
 SAF Documentaries on MINDEF (YouTube channel)
 Journal of the Singapore Armed Forces – Contains scholarly articles on military issues, including those pertaining to the SAF's transformation into a 3rd Generation Fighting Force
 GlobalSecurity.org Overview of Singapore's military forces, facilities, and equipment.
 MINDEF, The NS Portal, Retrieved 23 October 2006.
 Ranks and Paramilitary Ranks of Singapore , Retrieved 23 October 2006.

Military of Singapore